James Albert Fay (29 March 1884–1957) was an English footballer who played in the Football League for Bolton Wanderers, Oldham Athletic and Southport.

References

1884 births
1957 deaths
English footballers
Association football forwards
English Football League players
Chorley F.C. players
Oswaldtwistle Rovers F.C. players
Oldham Athletic A.F.C. players
Bolton Wanderers F.C. players
Southport F.C. players